Kalyani (Telugu: కళ్యాణి) was an Indian Telugu language soap opera that aired on Gemini TV from 17 June 2019 to 22 February 2020 every Monday to Saturday at 1:00PM IST. The serial starred Harika and Jay D'Souza as main protagonists and Jyothika, Priya, Vikas, and Niharika in pivotal roles.

Plot

The story revolves around the blind girl Kalyani who is abandoned by her mother Tulasi Devi, the business women due to her birth defect. Besides Kalyani was raised by her grandparents with the help of her father, without knowing her mother is alive. Unfortunately the fate brought the Kalyani to meet her mother and later conflicts arrived between them. Tulasi Devi hates Kalyani. Will the mother and daughter meet despite their disputes is main crux of the story.

Cast

Harika Sadu as Kalyani
Jay D'Souza as Aravind
Jyothika Munirathnam as Neha
Vikas as Raja Shekar (Kalyani and Neha's father)
Mamilla Shailaja Priya as Tulasi Devi (Kalyani and Neha's mother)
Niharika as Gayathri (Aravind's mother and Tulasi Devi's best friend) - deceased
Rajendra as Bhupathi, Karthik's father and Tulasi Devi's rival 
Akhil Sarthak as Karthik
Subha Aadiya

Former cast
Prabhakar as Raja sekhar, Kalyani and Neha's father (replaced by Vikas)

Airing history
The serial started airing on Gemini TV on 17 June 2019. It aired every Monday to Friday at 9:00PM IST. Later, a serial named Madhumasam replaced this show at 9:00PM and pushed this serial to 1:00PM IST from 2 September 2019. The serial ended on 22 February 2020 after airing 202 episodes.

Special appearance
Sampoornesh Babu in 46th episode

References

Indian television soap operas
Telugu-language television shows
2019 Indian television series debuts
Gemini TV original programming